The 1975–76 Bulgarian Cup was the 36th season of the Bulgarian Cup (in this period the tournament was named Cup of the Soviet Army). Levski Sofia won the competition, beating CSKA Sofia 4–3 after extra time in the final at the Vasil Levski National Stadium.

First round

|-
!colspan=3 style="background-color:#D0F0C0;" |1975

|}

Second round

|-
!colspan=3 style="background-color:#D0F0C0;" |14 February 1976

|}

Third round

Quarter-finals

Semi-finals

Final

Details

References

1975-76
1975–76 domestic association football cups
Cup

bg:Купа на Съветската армия 1975/76